Pierre Caron (19 June 1875, Versailles – 19 January 1952, Paris) was a French historian and archivist, specialising in the French Revolution.

Life
Entering the Archives nationales in 1898 and setting up the Revue d'histoire moderne et contemporaine soon afterwards, he published several bibliographic works. He headed the Archives from 1937 to 1941, during which time (in 1939) he led the 150th anniversary celebrations of the French Revolution, During the Battle of France he remained in Paris with his administration to safeguard his collections. He retired in 1941 and after the Second World War he was made a member of the Comité d’histoire de l’Occupation et de la libération de la France (CHOLF), which in 1951 became the Comité d’histoire de la Seconde Guerre mondiale.

Publications 
 Thesis : Noël Beda
 Le Commerce des céréales, 1907
 Tableaux de dépréciation du papier-monnaie, 1909
 Paris pendant la terreur : rapports des agents secrets du ministre de l'intérieur, 1910
 Les papiers des comités militaires de la Constituante, de la Législative et de la Convention (1789-an IV), 1912
 Manuel pratique pour l'étude de la révolution française, 1912, réédité cinq fois jusqu’en 1947
 Bibliographie des travaux publiés de 1866 à 1897 sur l'histoire de la France depuis 1789, 1912, réédité quatre fois jusqu’en 1974
 Comités militaires de la Constituante, de la Législative et de la Convention, 1913
 Commission de subsistance de l’An II, 1924
 La première terreur, 1792
 Le Maximum général, 1930
 Massacres de septembre 1792, 1936 (réédité deux fois)
 Liste mondiale des périodiques et bibliographies historiques, 1940
 La Délégation française auprès de la Commission allemande d'armistice
 Les missions du Conseil exécutif provisoire et de la Commune de Paris dans l'Est et le Nord, août-novembre 1792, 1953
 with Philippe Sagnac, Les comités des droits féodaux et de législation et l'abolition du régime seigneurial (1789–1793), published five times from 1907 to 1977

Sources 
 
 Charles Samaran, « Notice nécrologique », Bibliothèque de l’École des chartes, n° 111, 1953, p. 321-329.
 

People from Versailles
1875 births
1952 deaths
École Nationale des Chartes alumni
20th-century French historians
French archivists
French bibliographers
Historians of the French Revolution
French male non-fiction writers